The Haggier Massif rock gecko (Pristurus insignoides) is a species of lizard in the Sphaerodactylidae family found on Socotra Island. It is classified as Least Concern by the IUCN.

References

Pristurus
Reptiles described in 1986
Endemic fauna of Socotra